This is a list of the consorts of Afghan rulers. Historically, Afghan rulers, being Muslim, may have several wives, and not always a queen consort.

Afghanistan has only intermittently been a republic – between 1973–1992 and from 2001 onwards – at other times being governed by a variety of kings.

Consorts of the Hotaki Empire (1709–1738)

Hotaki Empire

Consorts of Durrani Empire (1747–1823)

Durrani Empire

Consorts of Emirate of Afghanistan (1823–1926)

Emirate of Afghanistan

Consorts of Kingdom of Afghanistan (1926–1973)

Kingdom of Afghanistan

See also
 First Lady of Afghanistan
 List of presidents of Afghanistan
 President of Afghanistan

References

External links
Afghanwiki.com

 
Queens
Afghanistan, List of royal consorts of